The Coastal and Marine Institute Laboratory (CMIL), formerly known as the Coastal Waters Laboratory, is an academic laboratory operated by the College of Sciences of San Diego State University (SDSU), in the Point Loma district of San Diego, California.

It is located on a coastal site at northern San Diego Bay, on the former grounds of the closed San Diego Naval Training Center, now part of the Liberty Station redevelopment project in Point Loma.

Research
The Laboratory focuses research on environmental and ecological problems on the Southern California Bight coastline in southern California,  caused by urbanization in the coastal environment at land-water interfaces, such as estuaries.

Current Research Projects
Coastal GIS Center
Wetlands Restoration Center (Pacific Estuarine Research Lab)
Coastal and Marine Ecology Group
Beach Water Quality Center

HPWREN
Data is transferred back from the Laboratory via the High Performance Research and Education Network (HPWREN).

Equipment
50,000 square foot Coastal Waters Laboratory
10,000 square feet devoted to outdoor aquaria and a greenhouse
Continuous flow seawater system from San Diego Bay
Large hall for classes, lectures, and workshops on resource issues
Boat maintenance and SCUBA diving facility
Specialized analytical, research, and wet laboratories, including:
Coastal Zone GIS Laboratory
Virus and Pathogen Laboratory

Coastal Zone Campus
Adjacent to the CMIL laboratory complex is another research laboratory, operated by the Metropolitan Wastewater Department (MWWD) of the City of San Diego, in order to consolidate marine monitoring and analytical operations.

Together, this has created a “Coastal Zone Campus” on San Diego Bay to allow mutual access to and sharing of new and innovative research ideas and activities among federal regional, and local entities, and nationally known scientists and experts, in order to exchange information related to the coastal zone environment.

See also

Scripps Institution of Oceanography

External links
Official SDSU Coastal Waters Laboratory website
SDSU College of Sciences
Marine Ecology and Biology Student Association
San Diego State University: main homepage

Oceanographic organizations
Laboratories in California
Research institutes in California
San Diego State University
Point Loma, San Diego
San Diego Bay
Buildings and structures in San Diego
Education in San Diego
Environmental organizations based in California
Organizations based in San Diego
University subdivisions in California
Estuaries of California
Water in California